Two regiments of the British Army have been numbered the 120th Regiment of Foot:

120th Regiment of Foot (1763), raised in 1762
120th Regiment of Foot (1794), raised in 1794